El Camino College (Elco or ECC) is a public community college in Alondra Park, California. It is one of two community colleges serving Southern California's South Bay area.

The El Camino Community College District was officially established on July 1, 1947.  the college served approximately 23,000 students within the El Camino Community College District, including the communities of Alondra Park, Carson, Del Aire, El Segundo, Gardena, Hawthorne, Hermosa Beach, Inglewood, Ladera Heights, Lawndale, Lennox, Lomita, Manhattan Beach, Redondo Beach, Torrance, View Park–Windsor Hills. El Camino College offers 2,500 classes in 85 programs, including vocational, undergraduate, and honors courses, many available in online and televised formats for distance education.

Student demographics

Total Students: 24,349

Campus media

KECC radio station
The college hosts one radio station, KECC.  The first time KECC was actually on the air experimentally was Career Day, April 27, 1994. The operation lasted only four hours, from 9 am to 1 pm. On November 11, 1994, KECC signed on the air for the first time as a regularly scheduled carrier current broadcast station. At that time, the frequency used was 1620 kHz.  In the fall of 2000 KECC changed frequency from 1200 kHz to 1500 kHz.

Athletics
Built in 1958, Murdock Stadium hosts some of the schools athletic programs.

In media

The college campus has been used as a filming location since at least the 1970s. Visitors to the IBM pavilion at the 1964-65 World's Fair in New York City saw an Eames film that featured El Camino coach Kenneth Swearingen and the school football team. Among other films shot in part at the college are:
 Cheaper by the Dozen (2003 remake)
 The Longest Yard (2005 remake)
 Crime After Crime
 The Dark Knight Rises
 The Circle
 Visiting... with Huell Howser Episode 513

Performing arts
El Camino College has a 2,000-seat auditorium, a 350-seat campus theatre, and the 190-seat Robert Hagg Recital Hall. The Marsee Auditorium is the venue for the South Bay Ballet's annual production of The Nutcracker, and is known for showcasing dance and opera companies, traveling artists, and other Broadway, film and television veterans, such as Shirley Jones and Gregory Hines. The Marsee Auditorium as well as the other on-campus venues also host El Camino College resident performers.

Schauerman Library
The Schauerman Library serves as the research center of the college. The library houses the El Camino College archives.

Notable alumni

 Mary Akor, long-distance runner
 Chet Baker, musician, (did not graduate)
 David Benoit, musician
 Antonio Chatman, NFL wide receiver, 1997
 Fred Claire, general manager, Los Angeles Dodgers
 Bo Derek, actress
 Carol Neblett, Operatic soprano
 Alan Jardine of The Beach Boys
 Chris Montez, singer (did not graduate)
 Chris Mortensen, ESPN
 Clara Lee, Actress
 Cliff Meidl, USA Kayaking Olympian
 David Pack
 Dennis Mangers, California Assemblyman
 Denny Hocking, professional baseball player
 Derrick Deese, Professional football player for San Francisco 49ers and Fox Sports Radio host
 Don Dulay, professional basketball player in the Philippine Basketball Association
 Donte Gamble, American football player
 Flo Hyman, USA Volleyball Olympian
 Fred Dryer, actor, producer and former football defensive end in the NFL
 Greg Cross (Skateboarding)|, professional Skateboarder(Transferred to University of Southern California)
George Foster, professional baseball player
 George Nakano, California Assemblyman
 Jason Farol, singer
 Keith Erickson, professional basketball player
 Kris Medlen, professional baseball player, attended but finished at Santa Ana College)
 Lynette Fromme, (didn't graduate)
 Michael Fincke, NASA astronaut
 John Ramsey, Public-address announcer for several Los Angeles professional sports teams
 Marcel Reece, NFL player
 Gerard Robinson, American education reformer
Tamir Saban (born 1999), American-Israeli basketball player 
 Nathan Salmon, professor (graduated under the name "Nathan Salmon Ucuzoglu")
 Niu Sale, American football player
 Lauren Sánchez
 Kenbrell Thompkins, football player
 Douglas Trumbull, filmmaker
 Park Jun-gyu, Korean Actor
 Ras Kass, Rapper (did not graduate)
 Robert Cornegy, New York City Councilmember
 Rudy de Leon, USA Deputy Secretary of Defense
 Saladin McCullough, American football player
 Suge Knight, Rap impresario
 Therese Murray, President of the Massachusetts Senate
 Frederico Lapenda Earned an AA degree in Theater in 1992 - Movie Producer, MMA Hall of Fame Promoter, Beverly Hills Film Festival President, Brazilian Tourism Ambassador, and Allies of the Amazon co-creator with Stan Lee.
 Brian Wilson (did not graduate)
 William Allen Young, actor

Notable faculty
 Fitzhugh Dodson, taught philosophy from 1959
 Julius Sumner Miller (1952–1974)

See also
 Compton Community College District (Compton College)

References

External links
 

 
California Community Colleges
Universities and colleges in Los Angeles County, California
Schools accredited by the Western Association of Schools and Colleges
Education in Torrance, California
Educational institutions established in 1947
1947 establishments in California